Smerek is a  surname. Notable people with the surname include:
Don Smerek (born 1957), American football player
Mike Smrek (born 1962), Canadian  professional basketball player

See also
Smrek